Mohammed Al-Fuhaid (born January 8, 1990) is a Saudi professional footballer who plays as a midfielder for Al-Fateh.

Career statistics

Club

Honours
Al-Fateh SC
Saudi Professional League: 2012–13
Saudi Super Cup: 2013

References

External links 
 

1990 births
Living people
Saudi Arabian footballers
People from Al-Hasa
Association football midfielders
Al-Fateh SC players
Saudi Professional League players
Saudi Arabian Shia Muslims